During the 2005–06 Dutch football season, Feyenoord competed in the Eredivisie.

Season summary
Feyenoord were once again the Eredivisie's top scorers and they improved on last's seasons results to finish 3rd, but the team was still some way off challenging for the title. The club also suffered elimination at the first hurdle in both the domestic and UEFA cups. The club's last chance for glory was to win the Eredivise's UEFA play-offs to qualify for the Champions League, but they were knocked out at the first stage again after an embarrassing 7-2 aggregate loss to an Ajax side who had finished 11 points behind the Rotterdam club.

Kits
Feyenoord's kits were manufactured by Italian company Kappa and sponsored by Belgian financial company Fortis.

First-team squad
Squad at end of season

Left club during season

Results

Eredivisie

Play-offs Eredivisie Champions League Qualification

Ajax won 7-2 on aggregate.

KNVB Cup

1/8 Final

UEFA Cup

First round

Rapid București won 2-1 on aggregate.

Friendlies

References

Notes

Feyenoord seasons
Feyenoord